Moshe Gidron (May 25, 1925 – November 14, 2009) was a major general in the Israel Defense Forces and former head of the Manpower Directorate.

Biography 
Gidron was born in Tel Aviv during the British Mandate of Palestine. At age 17 he joined Palmach as a wireless operator assisting Aliyah Bet ships. After the establishment of the state of Israel in 1948, he served as a communications officer in the Yiftach Brigade. He later served as chief communications officer of the Central Command and later in the Southern Command. During 1952–1953 he commanded the military training school for communications.

In 1966 he was made head of the Communications and Electronics Corps, serving in that capacity during the Six-Day War. He was discharged in 1972 as a Brigadier General, becoming CEO of the Koor Industries and Telrad telecommunications company.

Gidron returned to army service in April 1974, promoted to the rank of Major General (Aluf) as head of the IDF's Manpower Directorate. He held this position until 1976.

Following his discharge Gidron was appointed as Director General of the Ministry of Communications. In 1979 he was appointed as Israel's Consul General to Southwestern United States. Between the years 1988–2002 he was chief comptroller of the Israeli defense system.

Gidron's wife, Tamar, was the daughter of Dov Hoz. The couple had two sons and a daughter. One son, Ilan Gidron, was an IDF armored officer killed in action during the Yom Kippur War.

Gidron died in 2009 at age 84.

1925 births
2009 deaths
Israeli chief executives
Israeli generals